Tamás Debnár (born 20 March 1971) is a Hungarian swimmer. He competed in the men's 100 metre breaststroke at the 1988 Summer Olympics.

References

1971 births
Living people
Hungarian male swimmers
Olympic swimmers of Hungary
Swimmers at the 1988 Summer Olympics
Swimmers from Budapest